Heroes and Husbands is a 1922 American silent drama film directed by Chester Withey and starring Katherine MacDonald, Nigel Barrie and Charles K. Gerrard.

Cast
 Katherine MacDonald as Susanne Danbury 
 Nigel Barrie as Walter Gaylord 
 Charles Clary as Hugh Bemis 
 Charles K. Gerrard as Martin Tancray 
 Mona Kingsley as Agatha Bemis 
 Ethel Kaye as Annette

References

Bibliography
 Munden, Kenneth White. The American Film Institute Catalog of Motion Pictures Produced in the United States, Part 1. University of California Press, 1997.

External links

1922 films
1922 drama films
Silent American drama films
Films directed by Chester Withey
American silent feature films
1920s English-language films
American black-and-white films
First National Pictures films
Preferred Pictures films
1920s American films